The Otto C.I, also known as the Otto KD.15, was a German two-seat biplane reconnaissance and bomber aircraft of the First World War designed and produced by Otto Flugmaschinenfabrik. The C.I was a rare example of an aircraft flown by the Central Powers which had a pusher configuration.

Design and development
The German aeronautical engineer Gustav Otto designed the C.I as a reconnaissance aircraft for use by the Imperial German Flying Corps. It was an all wooden, fabric covered twin boom design with box-shaped booms. Forward was a large fuselage gondola with two seats, the observer sitting at the fore and the pilot to the rear. Behind the pilot was a six-cylinder engine driving a pusher propeller.

The unarmed prototype first flew in May or June 1915, named KD.15 and powered by a  Rapp engine. Production examples were given the official designation C.I and the observer was provided with a single machine gun for defence. The Rapp engine proved unreliable so production aircraft were also equipped with the lower-powered  Mercedes D.III or  Benz Bz.III.

The aircraft was produced in small numbers and proved to be the last made by the company. It is unrelated to the C.II made under license for LVG by Otto.

Operational history
The C.I entered very limited service with the Imperial German Air Service, serving only with Bavarian Feldflieger Abteilung like 4b, 8b and 9b.  They were delivered in two batches, each of six aircraft, ordered in August and November 1915 respectively, and served until at least April 1916.

Initially considered "good for nothing" by the Bavarian airmen who first flew them, the aircraft gained a positive reputation during their short careers. They were favourably viewed for their stability and reliability yet were nimble with good handling characteristics both on the ground and in the air.

The aircraft saw limited export success, being sold to the Bulgarian Air Force in 1915. Thirteen were delivered to Bozhurishte in spring 1916, serving with 2 Aeroplane Otdelenie based at Udovo. The first batch was powered by the Benz engine, while the latter used the slightly more powerful Mercedes inline. These aircraft were used in the bombing and reconnaissance role. They served until 1917, when they were replaced by the more capable Albatros C.III.

Operators
 
 Bulgarian Air Force

Luftstreitkräfte

Specification

See also

References

Notes

Bibliography

 

 

 
 

1910s German military reconnaissance aircraft
Aircraft first flown in 1915
Biplanes
Military aircraft of World War I
Single-engined pusher aircraft
Twin-boom aircraft